Nevado Las Agujas (Spanish for The Snowy Needles) is a pyramidal peak in the Andes Mountains of Futrono, in Chile, close to the border with Argentina. Together with Cerro Chihuío, it forms the granitic mountain massif of Nevados Las Agujas, which geologically belongs to the North Patagonian Batholith.

Mountains of Chile
Las Agujas